Lionnel Franck Djimgou Tchoumbou (born 27 March 1989) is a Cameroonian footballer who last played for FC Daugava as a forward.

Club career
Tchoumbou began his career 1999 by Valencia CF and moved 2001 to Real Madrid, he played 7 years on youth side from Madrid. In July 2008 moved to Xerez CD, the club from Jerez, Andalusia loaned him in August 2008 for one year to  CD San Fernando.

In July 2010 he was signed by the Latvian side FC Daugava. He played 5 matches there, scoring no goals and was released after the season.

Personal life
He holds a Spanish passport.

Notes

1989 births
Living people
Cameroonian footballers
Valencia CF players
Spanish people of Cameroonian descent
Spanish sportspeople of African descent
Xerez CD footballers
Spanish footballers
Naturalised citizens of Spain
Cameroonian emigrants to Spain
CD San Fernando players
Xerez CD B players
Footballers from Yaoundé
Cameroonian expatriate footballers
Spanish expatriate footballers
Cameroonian expatriate sportspeople in Latvia
Expatriate footballers in Latvia
FC Daugava players
Association football forwards